The Big Chief tablet is a popular writing notebook designed for young children in the United States. It is made with newsprint paper and features widely spaced lines, easier to use for those learning to write. The tablet has a prominent representation of an American Indian man in full headdress on the cover, hence the name "Big Chief".

History

The tablet was originated by William Albrecht (1879–1945), whose family had a stationery business in Quincy, Illinois. In 1906 he opened the Western Tablet Company in St. Joseph, Missouri, and it became the world's largest paper tablet producer. Albrecht's home on Frederick Boulevard in St. Joseph is now the Albrecht-Kemper Museum of Art. Big Chief tablets are still available for purchase from the Museum Shop.  Western Tablet trademarked the Big Chief in 1947. Western Tablet expanded in the 1920s and moved its headquarters to Dayton, Ohio but most of the manufacturing components remained in St. Joseph. In 1964 the company was renamed "Westab."

Usage of the Big Chief peaked in the 1960s when another Westab invention—the spiral notebook—began to claim bigger market share.

In 1966, the Mead Corporation acquired Western Tablet. Mead subsequently sold the Big Chief line to Springfield Tablet of Springfield, Missouri.

In January 2001, Everett Pad and Paper of Everett, Washington, purchased the inventory from Springfield. They closed their plant, after 80 years operations, and Big Chief tablet production was halted. The plant in St. Joseph where the tablets were produced was closed in 2004 when Mead left the city.

In 2012, American Trademark Publishing of Brookshire, Texas, resumed the production of the Big Chief Writing Tablet.

Literary references

Hugo Award winning science-fiction author Connie Willis writes her books by hand on Big Chief Tablets which she buys in bulk.
In John Kennedy Toole's novel A Confederacy of Dunces, the protagonist Ignatius Reilly pens his philosophical ramblings on Big Chief tablets.
In the play by Tennessee Williams, Suddenly, Last Summer, the poet Sebastian Venable is said to write his annual 'Poem of Summer' in a Big Chief tablet.
In "In God We Trust: All Others Pay Cash" by Jean Shepherd, Ralphie uses it to decode the secret code from the Little Orphan Annie radio show. This book of short stories was the basis for A Christmas Story.
In the 1994 film Forrest Gump, Forrest can be seen getting on the bus holding a "Big Chief Tablet". It also appears in the famous "run Forrest, run" scene.
In the poem "Remembrance" by Ray Bradbury the author tells of finding an old note, written in his childhood, on "Ruled paper from an old Sioux Indian Head scribble writing book."
In the Waltons TV movie The Homecoming John-Boy Walton hides a Big Chief tablet he’s been using to jot down his thoughts.
In the Little House on the Prairie season 5 episode "The Cheaters", Andy Garvey uses a Big Chief tablet to copy questions before a big test.

See also
 Examination book (sometimes referred to as a "blue book")

References

Notebooks
Early childhood education in the United States